This is a list of public art in Nottingham, in Nottinghamshire, England. This list applies only to works of public art accessible in an outdoor public space. For example, this does not include artwork visible inside a museum.

Central Nottingham

Nottingham Council House

Beeston

Clifton

Lenton

Meadows

Sneinton

West Bridgford

Wilford

References

Nottingham
Art
Publiv art